Luke Matthew Pavone (born March 29, 1995) is an American professional soccer player who plays as a defender for USL League One club Richmond Kickers.

References

External links
 
 Buffalo State profile
 UMass Athletics profile

1995 births
Living people
American soccer players
American expatriate soccer players
American expatriate sportspeople in Israel
Association football defenders
Expatriate footballers in Israel
Hapoel Petah Tikva F.C. players
Liga Leumit players
National Premier Soccer League players
Richmond Kickers players
Soccer players from New York (state)
Sportspeople from Rochester, New York
USL League One players
FC Buffalo players
Buffalo State Bengals men's soccer players
UMass Minutemen soccer players